Delatorreidae is a family of woodlice. It includes the genera Acanthoniscus, Cuzcodinella and Pseudarmadillo.

References

Woodlice
Crustacean families